The Christiana Mall is a super-regional shopping mall located between the cities of Newark and Wilmington, Delaware, United States. The mall is situated at the intersection of Interstate 95 (exit 4A) and Delaware Route 1/Delaware Route 7 (DE 1 exit 164), near the Cavaliers Country Club, and close to the center of the Northeast megalopolis.

Christiana Mall has four anchor stores - Nordstrom, Macy's, JCPenney, and Target - along with Barnes & Noble as a junior anchor and Cabela's and Cinemark Theatres located along the mall's perimeter. The mall contains 179 shops, and is owned and managed by Brookfield Properties. It has  of gross leasable area on one level. Christiana Mall is the largest shopping mall in the state of Delaware and the largest in the five states without sales tax outside of Oregon. Due to the lack of sales tax in Delaware, the mall attracts numerous shoppers from neighboring states.

Location
The Christiana Mall is located in an unincorporated area of northern New Castle County, Delaware near the community of Christiana between the Delaware cities of Wilmington and Newark and the larger cities of Philadelphia and Baltimore. The mall is situated southeast of an interchange between Interstate 95 and Delaware Route 1/Delaware Route 7. Access to the mall is from exit 164 of DE 1, which connects to Mall Road, the ring road around the mall. Exit 4A of I-95 provides access to southbound DE 1 and Mall Road. The trade area surrounding Christiana Mall has a population of 680,804.

Christiana Mall is served by DART First State bus routes 5, 15, 33, 37, 44, 51, 54, 55, and 64 providing local bus service to Wilmington, Newark, and other points in New Castle County along with inter-county bus service along Route 301 to Dover and seasonal service along Route 305 to Lewes and Rehoboth Beach. All buses serving the Christiana Mall stop at the Christiana Mall Park & Ride near Nordstrom while routes 5, 15, and 51 also serve the bus stop near Target.

Description
Christiana Mall contains  of retail space and has 179 stores. The mall is anchored by JCPenney, Macy's, Nordstrom, and Target, with Barnes & Noble serving as a junior anchor and Cabela's and Cinemark Theatres serving as outparcels. The mall has smaller retailers including Apple Store, Barnes & Noble, Kiehl's, and Urban Outfitters. Christiana Mall has various dining options including a food court and restaurants such as Brio Tuscan Grille and The Cheesecake Factory.

The Christiana Mall is a popular destination for shoppers in the Delaware Valley area centered around Philadelphia while also attracting visitors from the New York, Baltimore, and Washington, D.C. areas looking for tax-free shopping. The mall attracts over 20 million visitors annually. Christiana Mall is one of the top producing malls in the United States. The Apple Store at the Christiana Mall claims to sell more iPhones than any other location in the chain. The Christiana Mall has an appraised value of over $1 billion.

Basketball player Charles Barkley's daughter, Christiana, was named after the mall.  In a 2021 podcast, he explained, "...I just liked the mall."

Anchor stores
JCPenney - (2 floors, opened 1978, original anchor)
Macy's - (2 floors, opened in 1986, previously Bamberger's)
Nordstrom - (2 floors, opened in 2011, built on the site of the former Strawbridge's)
Target - (1 floor, opened in 2010 on the site of the former Lord & Taylor and Wanamaker's)
Barnes & Noble - (2 floors, opened in 2009)

History

Early history

Christiana Mall was developed in the late 1970s by The Rubin Company and New Castle Associates to compete with the smaller Triangle Mall (later New Castle Square Mall) and Castle Mall (Pencader Plaza) a few miles away. The land that the mall was built on consisted of four family farms. The main building of the mall was the Lynam Farm. The Cabela's site and parts of I-95 was the Morgan family farm. Adjacent retail developments consisted of land from the Clayville and Carroll family farms.

Strawbridge & Clothier was the first store to open in September, 1978. It included a tall clock tower outside and a restaurant on a second floor balcony above the mall entrance overlooking a large inverted water fountain in which water cascaded into a deep pool in the middle. Shortly after, on October 16, 1978, the first phase of the mall opened to the public which included small shops from Strawbridge & Clothier to the Bamberger's court (which is now Macy's) which included a second fountain. Bamberger's and the wing to and including JCPenney was constructed in phase 2 which opened in 1979.

Department store changes
The 1990s brought a lot of department store changes for Christiana Mall. In 1991, Wanamaker's opened a 2 level anchor store at the mall. It was the last Wanamaker's store to be built. In 1995, Hecht's of Washington, DC, a division of the May Department Stores Company of St. Louis, acquired the Wanamaker's chain, converting all locations to Hecht's. A year later, Hecht's also acquired the Strawbridge & Clothier chain, which was historically Wanamaker's main rival (and co-anchor at Christiana Mall). Since the renamed Wanamaker's did not do as well as projected with the Hecht's name, the decision was made to keep the Strawbridge's name, although the Clothier was dropped. The  former Wanamaker's store was refitted for Lord & Taylor in 1997. It was the only Lord & Taylor location in Delaware.

Things calmed down until 2005 when Federated Department Stores, which owned Macy's and Bloomingdales, bought the May department store chains. The purchase left Federated with three of the four anchor stores at Christiana Mall: Macy's, Strawbridge's, and Lord & Taylor. Federated closed Strawbridge's and the Lord & Taylor location in 2006. Mall owner General Growth Properties acquired the Strawbridge's building for an undisclosed price, but no definite plans were announced at that time for the former Lord & Taylor space.

The vacant Lord & Taylor was ultimately demolished in early 2010 to build a one-level Target store. Target opened for business later that year, on October 10, 2010.

The vacant Strawbridge's store was demolished in 2008. A  Nordstrom store, along with a new wing of additional high-end retailers, was built to replace Strawbridge's. The new Nordstrom opened on April 8, 2011, as the first store in the state of Delaware and third in the Philadelphia area.

In 2013, construction began on the outside of the ring road opposite Nordstrom on a  Cabela's store. Cabela's opened in May 2014.

Additional construction was completed for a new 12-screen cinema Cinemark Theatres complex, which opened in November 2014.

Ownership changes
In March 2003, The Rouse Company made an agreement with Philadelphia-based Pennsylvania Real Estate Investment Trust (PREIT) to acquire 50% stake in Christiana. Rouse received its stake in Christiana and $225 million in cash in exchange PREIT would receive six malls and assume $285 million in mortgage debt. PREIT would also hand over $38 million worth of stock to a partnership controlled by its executives that held the stake in Christiana. The six malls Rouse traded were older properties anchored by such stores as Strawbridge's, Sears and JCPenney. The malls were Cherry Hill Mall, Moorestown Mall, Plymouth Meeting Mall, The Gallery at Market East, Exton Square Mall and Echelon Mall. Rouse's strategy in the trade was to upgrading their assets. By acquiring Christiana, which is one of the top-production malls in the United States, Rouse achieved this mission while shedding properties that better fit into PREIT's portfolio.

1991 redevelopment
The first renovation and expansion of the mall was completed in 1991. It consisted of the triangular Wanamaker's concourses extending from Macy's and JCPenney. Where the two converged was an atrium of full-ceiling skylights and a new fountain, becoming the new center court where the majority of events take place. Now with four anchors, three of them concentrated at the southern end, the mall as a whole took on a bent, cross-like shape.

2008-2011 redevelopment

General Growth Properties purchased the former Lord & Taylor store, planning a new concept known as "The Epicenter Collection", an Internet catalog showroom. Those plans were abandoned by December 2008, when the empty anchor was sold to Target Corporation, the building was demolished in March 2010 and Target opened October 10, 2010. A new food court opened in Spring 2009 in space previously occupied by a movie theater. The new food court features Charley's Grilled Subs, McDonald's, Sbarro and Taco Bell. The original food court was converted to retail space. The  Strawbridge's store was demolished and replaced with additional mall space and a new two-level,  Nordstrom which opened on April 8, 2011.

An outdoor "avenue style" facing retail space was added to two sides of the center. Additions included new lighting, flooring and a deceiving two-story high entrance adjacent to the food court next to XXI Forever and Barnes & Noble, though the mall interior remains entirely single level. The project moved, updated, or replaced up to 100 of the center's stores. The redevelopment plans were designed by architecture firm RTKL Associates Inc.

2013-2014 redevelopment
In 2013, work began on development of a  square foot Cabela's store, a  square foot 12-screen Cinemark Theatres both as outparcels to the mall. As a part of this exterior development project the mall's ring-road will be widened and additional parking will be added. The I-95 flyover ramps were completed in the fall of 2013 and dedicated by Governor Jack Markell on October 17, 2013.

Exterior development projects were completed in 2014. Cabela's opened in May and the 12-screen Cinemark Theatre opened in November. In the spring and summer of 2014, Christiana Mall added many new stores to the interior of the mall while many existing stores remodeled.

References

External links

 Official website

Brookfield Properties
Shopping malls in Delaware
Buildings and structures in New Castle County, Delaware
Shopping malls established in 1978
Tourist attractions in New Castle County, Delaware
1978 establishments in the United States